2525 (Exordium & Terminus) is the debut studio album by Zager and Evans and was released in 1969.  It reached #30 on the Billboard Top LPs chart. 
The album featured the single "In the Year 2525 (Exordium & Terminus)" which reached #1 on the Billboard Hot 100, on the adult contemporary chart, on the UK Singles Chart,  and on the Canadian Pop and AC charts.

Track listing

Personnel
Rick Evans – guitar, producer
Denny Zager – guitar,  producer
Mark Dalton – bass
Dave Trupp – drums
Norm Christian – drums
Bobby Christian – arrangements, orchestrations 
Technical
Brian Christian – engineer

Charts

Singles

References

1969 debut albums
RCA Records albums
RCA Victor albums